The Red is an 8-minute psychological thriller created by Borderline Films (makers of Martha Marcy May Marlene and Simon Killer) and advertising agency SS+K on behalf of SALT, a free resource created by the non-profit American Student Assistance.

The Red is aimed towards making college students and recent graduates aware of their student loans and the inescapable anxiety and dread that it creates. The film is part of a sustained, multi-media campaign created to compel and empower young people to take control of their debt on a practical, day-to-day level.

The Red, distributed to theaters by Hollywood Branding International, premiered on May 2, 2013, in five major cities: Boston, MA; Washington, D.C.; Chicago, IL; Seattle, WA; and Tampa Bay, FL.  Entertainment Nation, a division of Hollywood Branding International hosted VIP film premiere events in conjunction with the theatrical broadcast in each city.  The entire film short is now streaming online at FaceTheRed.com.

Cast 
 Amy Northup as Kate
 Marisa Parry as Clara
 Drew Lewis as Charlie
 Phillip Chorba as Boss
 Jean Liuzzi as Teller
 Adam Byrd as ATM Man
 Laura Peterson as Waitress
 Tommy Maher as himself

Production credits 
Station Film Presents A Borderline Film The Red starring Amy Northup And Marisa Parry Directed By Borderline Films Edited By Andrew Marcus Music by Stenfert Charles Director Of Photography Joe Anderson Special Effects By MPC Art Directed, Written And Produced By SS+K.

References

External links 
 

2013 films
2013 psychological thriller films
American psychological thriller films
2010s English-language films
2010s American films